Colpton  is a Canadian rural community in Lunenburg County, Nova Scotia.

References
Colpton on Destination Nova Scotia

Communities in Lunenburg County, Nova Scotia